Anton Weiss-Wendt (born 1973) is a Norwegian academic and historian. He has a PhD in Jewish history from Brandeis University and has worked at the Center for Studies of the Holocaust and Religious Minorities since 2006.

Works

References

1973 births
Living people
Brandeis University alumni
21st-century Norwegian historians
Historians of Estonia
Historians of the Soviet Union
Historians of the Holocaust